Gil Zur (also Romanized as Gīl Zūr; also known as Gol Zūr and Golzūr) is a village in Basharyat-e Gharbi Rural District, Basharyat District, Abyek County, Qazvin Province, Iran. At the 2006 census, its population was 566, in 135 families.

References 

Populated places in Abyek County